Vallès Oriental is a comarca (county) in Catalonia, Spain.  Its capital is Granollers. Along with Vallès Occidental it forms the grand comarca of Vallès.

In May 2015, Vallès Oriental lost four municipalities - Castellcir, Castellterçol, Granera, Sant Quirze Safaja - to the new comarca of Moianès.

Municipalities

Vegetation 
The natural vegetation of Vallès Oriental is typically Mediterranean, with a predominance of Holm oak, cork oak, and Aleppo pine. There are some oaks (in the narrow sense of the word) at Montnegre and Montseny. The latter also features European beech and silver fir woods.

References

External links 
  
Information about Vallès Oriental from the Generalitat de Catalunya (in Catalan)

 
Vallès
Comarques of the Province of Barcelona